Jiangnanxidao (Chinese: 江南西道, Circuit of Western Jiangnan; Gan: Kongnomsitau) was a southern circuit of Tang Empire. It corresponds to part of present-day Jiangxi, Hubei, Hunan, Anhui. Jiangnanxidao is the origin where the name "Jiangxi" derives from, and its administrative territories also roughly represent nowadays Gan-speaking areas in China.

Jiangnanxidao was split from Jiangnandao in 733 with its capital located in Hongzhou (洪州, Gan: Fungjiu), modern-day Nanchang. Jiangnanxidao was divided into nineteen prefectures, namely: 
 Xuanzhou, 宣州
 Shezhou, 歙州
 Chizhou, 池州
 Hongzhou, 洪州
 Jiangzhou, 江州
 Ezhou, 鄂州
 Yuezhou, 岳州
 Raozhou, 饒州
 Qianzhou, 虔州
 Jizhou, 吉州
 Yuanzhou, 袁州
 Xinzhou, 信州
 Fuzhou, 撫州
 Tanzhou, 潭州
 Hengzhou, 衡州
 Yongzhou, 永州
 Daozhou, 道州
 Binzhou, 郴州
 Shaozhou, 邵州

References 

Circuits of the Tang dynasty
Former circuits in Jiangxi
Former circuits in Hubei
Former circuits in Hunan
Former circuits in Anhui